Organogenesis is the phase of embryonic development that starts at the end of gastrulation and continues until birth. During organogenesis, the three germ layers formed from gastrulation (the ectoderm, endoderm, and mesoderm) form the internal organs of the organism. 

The cells of each of the three germ layers undergo differentiation, a process where less-specialized cells become more-specialized through the expression of a specific set of genes. Cell differentiation is driven by cell signaling cascades. Differentiation is influenced by extracellular signals such as growth factors that are exchanged to adjacent cells which is called juxtracrine signaling or to neighboring cells over short distances which is called paracrine signaling. Intracellular signals consist of a cell signaling itself (autocrine signaling), also play a role in organ formation. These signaling pathways allow for cell rearrangement and ensure that organs form at specific sites within the organism. The organogenesis process can be studied using embryos and organoids.

Organs produced by the germ layers 

The endoderm is the inner most germ layer of the embryo which gives rise to gastrointestinal and respiratory organs by forming epithelial linings and organs such as the liver, lungs, and pancreas. The mesoderm or middle germ layer of the embryo will form the blood, heart, kidney, muscles, and connective tissues. The ectoderm or outermost germ layer of the developing embryo forms epidermis, the brain, and the nervous system.

Mechanism of organ formation 
While each germ layer forms specific organs, in the 1820s, embryologist Heinz Christian Pander discovered that the germ layers cannot form their respective organs without the cellular interactions from other tissues.  In humans, internal organs begin to develop within 3–8 weeks after fertilization. The germ layers form organs by three processes: folds, splits, and condensation. Folds form in the germinal sheet of cells and usually form an enclosed tube which you can see in the development of vertebrates neural tube. Splits or pockets may form in the germinal sheet of cells forming vesicles or elongations. The lungs and glands of the organism may develop this way.

A primary step in organogenesis for chordates is the development of the notochord, which induces the formation of the neural plate, and ultimately the neural tube in vertebrate development. The development of the neural tube will give rise to the brain and spinal cord. Vertebrates develop a neural crest that differentiates into many structures, including bones, muscles, and components of the central nervous system. Differentiation of the ectoderm into the neural crest, neural tube, and surface ectoderm is sometimes referred to as neurulation and the embryo in this phase is the neurula. The coelom of the body forms from a split of the mesoderm along the somite axis

Plant organogenesis 
In plants, organogenesis occurs continuously and only stops when the plant dies. In the shoot, the shoot apical meristems regularly produce new lateral organs (leaves or flowers) and lateral branches. In the root, new lateral roots form from weakly differentiated internal tissue (e.g. the xylem-pole pericycle in the model plant Arabidopsis thaliana). In vitro and in response to specific cocktails of hormones (mainly auxins and cytokinins), most plant tissues can de-differentiate and form a mass of dividing totipotent stem cells called a callus. Organogenesis can then occur from those cells. The type of organ that is formed depends on the relative concentrations of the hormones in the medium. Plant organogenesis can be induced in tissue culture and used to regenerate plants.

See also 

Organoid
Ectoderm
Embryogenesis
Endoderm
Eye development
Gastrulation
Germ layer
Germ line development
Gonadogenesis
Heart development
Histogenesis
Limb development
Mesoderm
Morphogenesis
Noogenesis
List of human cell types derived from the germ layers

References

External links 
 

Developmental biology
Embryology